This page gathers the results of elections in Molise.

Regional elections

Latest regional election

List of previous regional elections
1970 Molise regional election
1975 Molise regional election
1980 Molise regional election
1985 Molise regional election
1990 Molise regional election
1995 Molise regional election
2000 Molise regional election
2001 Molise regional election
2006 Molise regional election
2011 Molise regional election
2013 Molise regional election

 
Politics of Molise